Bebearia maledicta, the maligned forester, is a butterfly in the family Nymphalidae. It is found in Sierra Leone, Liberia, Ivory Coast, Ghana, western Nigeria, Cameroon and the Republic of the Congo. The habitat consists of forests.

References

Butterflies described in 1912
maledicta